The Pratt & Whitney JT12, (US military designation J60) is a small turbojet engine. The Pratt & Whitney T73 (Pratt & Whitney JFTD12) is a related turboshaft engine.

Design and development
The J60 conception and project design began in July 1957 at United Aircraft of Canada (now Pratt & Whitney Canada) in Montreal. The project design details were transferred to the main P&W company in East Hartford and in May 1958, the first prototype, with military designation YJ60-P-1 commenced testing.

Flight tests were completed in early 1959; followed by the delivery of the new JT12A-5 engines in July 1959. These were for the two Canadair CL-41 prototype trainers with a rating of 12.9 kN (2,900 lb st). The modified JT12A-3 turbojets with a basic rating of 14.69 kN (3,300 lb st) were tested in the two Lockheed XV-4A Hummingbird VTOL research aircraft. The next version, JT12A-21, had an afterburner which delivered a maximum thrust of 17.91 kN (4,025 lb st).

Variants
Data from Janes 
YJ60-P-1prototype
J60-P-3
J60-P-3A
J60-P-4
J60-P-5
J60-P-6
J60-P-9
T73
Military designation of the Pratt & Whitney JFTD12 free power turbine turboshaft version of the J60.
JT12A-3LH
JT12A-6Essentially similar to the -5
JT12A-6A
JT12A-7(J60-P-4) up-rated to 
JT12A-8
JT12A-8A
JT12A-21An after-burning version developing  thrust wet.
FT12
Turboshaft versions for marine use.
JFTD12
Company designation of the Pratt & Whitney T73 free power turbine turbo-shaft version of the J60.

Applications

Civilian (JT12)
 Lockheed JetStar
 North American Sabreliner
 Aérotrain Experimental 02 (French Touch in 60')

Military (J60)
 Lockheed XH-51
 Lockheed XV-4 Hummingbird
 Martin/General Dynamics RB-57F Canberra
 North American T-2B Buckeye
 North American T-39 Sabreliner
 Sikorsky S-69

Specifications (JT12A-8A)

See also

References

External links

 Pratt & Whitney J60
 Atlantic Canadian Aviation: JT12 for Canadair aircraft

1950s turbojet engines
JT12
Pratt & Whitney Canada aircraft engines